Wheels of Confusion may refer to:
Wheels of Confusion/The Straightener, a song from Black Sabbath's 1972 album Black Sabbath, Vol. 4
Under Wheels of Confusion, a Black Sabbath compilation album released in 1996